The Turnberry-B.O.A.C. Foursomes Tournament was a pro-am golf tournament played at Turnberry, South Ayrshire, Scotland. The event was held in 1969 and 1970. It had a similar format to the Gleneagles Hotel Foursomes Tournament which had finished in 1966. The tournament was sponsored by British Transport Hotels, the owners of Turnberry, and B.O.A.C. The 1970 final was delayed by a day because of bad weather.

Winners

References

Golf tournaments in Scotland
Team golf tournaments
Defunct golf tournaments
Sport in South Ayrshire
Recurring sporting events established in 1969
Recurring sporting events disestablished in 1970
1969 establishments in Scotland
1970 disestablishments in Scotland